The 2008 Bulgarian Supercup was the sixth Bulgarian Supercup match, a football match which was contested between the A Group champion, CSKA Sofia, and the winner of Bulgarian Cup, Litex Lovech. The match was held on 3 August 2008 at the Vasil Levski National Stadium in Sofia, Bulgaria. CSKA beat Litex 1–0 to win their third Bulgarian Supercup.

Match details

References

2008
PFC CSKA Sofia matches
PFC Litex Lovech matches
Supercup